King-Lincoln Park is an 18.8 acre (76,000 m²) park in Newport News, Virginia. It is maintained by the Newport News Department of Parks, Recreation and Tourism.

Location 
It is located on Hampton Roads. Since 1937, a beach has existed in the park.

References 

Virginia municipal and county parks
Parks in Newport News, Virginia